"A" is a song by the South Korean girl group Rainbow.  It was released on August 12, 2010, and was later included on their second mini album So Girls.

Background 
A teaser photo with the concept of the song was released on August 4. A teaser of the music video was released on August 10 and the full music video on August 12, along with the release of the single.

Composition 
The song was produced by Han Jae Ho and Kim Seung Soo (also known as Sweetune), who also produced the songs "Rock U", "Pretty Girl", "Honey", "Wanna", "Mister" and "Lupin" for their label-mate KARA.

Promotions 
The promotions of the song started on August 13 in the KBS's Music Bank. It was also promoted on MBC's Music Core, SBS's Inkigayo and Mnet's M! Countdown.

Track listing

Chart performance 
In the first week, the song was at number 50 and climbed to the number 11 the following week. The peak position was 9, in the week of September 4. The song ranked number 80 in Gaon's yearly chart with 337,665,388 points and with 1,617,074 digital copies sold.

Charts

Japanese version

The song was re-record in Japanese as the group's first single in Japan. It was released digitally on September 7, 2011, and physically on September 14 in four different versions: three limited editions (CD+DVD, CD + 32-pages photobook and CD only with a bonus track) and a regular edition.

Composition
The Japanese version remains some lyrics written by Song Soo Yoon and was translated by Yu Shimoji and nice73. The B-side is a Japanese version of the song "Gossip Girl", previously recorded in Korean. The song is the lead single from their first EP Gossip Girl.

Promotions
In Japan, Rainbow performed the song on the shows Happy Music, Hey!Hey!Hey! Music Champ and Music Japan. The group held their first event in the Ikebukuro district of Tokyo with a crowd of 2,000 fans. They performed "A" and had a 15-minute talk session.

Track listing

Chart performance
The physical single began at number 3 in Oricon's daily chart and also number 3 in Oricon's weekly chart with 24,082 copies sold in the first week. After hearing about their position in Japan, the girls said, "When we first heard that we were ranked in third, we were all surprised because we had no idea that they’d take such an interest in us. There were even some members who cried. There’s also a lot of pressure in that we have to work harder and do better. We’re still very grateful and thankful for our position on the charts. Since we’re already receiving so much love, we’re really not anticipating a rise in the weekly charts. For the remainder of our stay here, we’re just going to do our best."

Charts

Oricon

Other charts

Ab dance controversy
The "ab dance" in Rainbow's choreography was banned from broadcasting on September 8, 2010, because it was "too sexually suggestive". The dance move involves the group lifting their shirts up to the point where their abdomen or stomach can be seen before taking them down again which was deemed similar to a strip tease. The music video was also age restricted on YouTube, but DSP retired the restriction. They started promoting the song without the "ab dance" on September 11.

However, when the group promoted the song in Japan they were allowed to perform the dance, and referred to it as the "belly dance".

Release history

References

External links
 "A" (Japanese) music video teaser (DSP version) on YouTube
 "A" (Japanese) music video teaser (Universal Music Japan version) on YouTube
 "A" (Korean) music video on YouTube
 "A" (Korean) music video teaser on YouTube

2010 songs
2010 singles
2011 singles
Rainbow (girl group) songs
Korean-language songs
Japanese-language songs